Shenzhen Library is the public library system of Shenzhen, Guangdong, China. The main library is a part of the Shenzhen Cultural Center in Futian District.

The main library occupies a  building on a  plot of land.

History
It was previously the Bao'an County Library.  there were 627 public library facilities in Shenzhen. The previous facility opened in 1986 in Lychee Park's northwest area after construction that began in 1983.

In 2009 the city government began a library platform program called "City of Libraries" ("City of Library").

References

External links

 Shenzhen Library
 Shenzhen Library 

Arata Isozaki buildings
Public libraries in China
Libraries in Guangdong
Education in Shenzhen